Sheng Hua Tang is a Chinese classic herbal formula that stimulates blood flow and relieves pain. The herbal formula is widely used by Chinese women who after giving birth will use the formula to improve blood flow. According to the Taoist Center, this formula is the most popular post-partum formula to restore blood flow.

Ingredients
 24g of Dang Gui (Angelicae sinensis root)
 9g of Chuan Xiong (Ligusticum striatum root)
 6-9g of Tao Ren (Prunus persica kernel)
 1.5g of Pao Jiang (blast fried Zingiber officinale root)
 1.5g of Zhi Gan Cao (honey fried Glycyrrhiza uralensis root)

See also
 Chinese classic herbal formula
 Chinese patent medicine

References

External links
 Sheng Hua Tang: Chinese herbal medicine formula
 New Mother's Formula: Jia Wei Sheng Hua Tang
 Alternative Healing University - Sheng Hua Tang
 Daoist Center: Inner History of China
 Florida College of Integrative Medicine (Medicine Course)
 Florida College of Integrative Medicine

Traditional Chinese medicine pills